Park chi-guk (Hangul: 박치국; born March 10, 1998) is South Korean professional baseball pitcher who is currently playing for the Doosan Bears of the KBO League.

He is a sidearm pitcher. He graduated from Jemulpo High School(Hangul: 제물포고등학교, Hanja: 濟物浦高等學校) and was selected to Doosan Bears by a draft in 2017.(2nd draft, 1st round)

He represented South Korea at the 2018 Asian Games.

Pitching style
Park throws most of his pitch four-seam fastball that averages 87 mph. He also throws 78 mph slider, 75 mph curveball, and 79 mph changeup 10% each.

References

External links 
 Career statistics and player information from the KBO League
 Park Chi-guk at Doosan Bears Baseball Club

1998 births
Living people
Baseball players at the 2018 Asian Games
Asian Games gold medalists for South Korea
Medalists at the 2018 Asian Games
Asian Games medalists in baseball
Doosan Bears players
KBO League pitchers
South Korean baseball players
Sportspeople from Incheon